Elitzur Jaffa Tel Aviv , or simply Elitzur Jaffa, is an Israeli football club based in Jaffa, Tel Aviv. The club is currently in Liga Gimel Tel Aviv division.

History
The club was founded in 2003 and joined Liga Gimel Tel Aviv division, where they play ever since.

For the 2014–15 season, the club aimed for promotion to Liga Bet, and signed several experienced players. During the season, the club was joined by former Israel international, Felix Halfon (which left after 5 matches for Hapoel Abirei Bat Yam) and former Israel U-21 international, Reuven Oved. The club finished the season in the fourth place, its best placing to date.

External links
Elitzur Jaffa Tel Aviv Israel Football Association

References

Football clubs in Israel
Football clubs in Tel Aviv
Association football clubs established in 2003
2003 establishments in Israel
Arab-Israeli football clubs